Massamba Lô Sambou (born 17 September 1986) is a Senegalese professional footballer who last played for Ulaanbaatar City.

Career
Born in Kolda, Sambou can play in central defense, but also as a defensive midfielder. In 2006, he signed its first professional contract with his formative club, Monaco. He played in the 2008–09 season for Le Havre on loan from Monaco. On 11 June 2010, left his club FC Nantes and signed a three years contract for Greek side Atromitos.

On 8 July 2011, he joined French Ligue 2 club Troyes on a two-year contract, but was released in a one month. In January 2012 he signed a contract with LB Châteauroux until June 2013.

International career
In 2007, he was called up for the first time to the Senegal national football team.

Club statistics

References

1986 births
Living people
Association football defenders
Senegalese footballers
Senegal international footballers
Senegalese expatriate footballers
Senegalese expatriate sportspeople in France
Senegalese expatriate sportspeople in Greece
Expatriate footballers in Greece
Expatriate footballers in France
Expatriate footballers in Cyprus
Expatriate footballers in Monaco
Expatriate footballers in India
Expatriate footballers in Mongolia
AS Monaco FC players
Le Havre AC players
ES Troyes AC players
FC Nantes players
LB Châteauroux players
Atromitos F.C. players
AEL Limassol players
Valmieras FK players
Ulaanbaatar City FC players
Ligue 1 players
Ligue 2 players
Super League Greece players
Cypriot First Division players
Indian Super League players
Latvian Higher League players